

Critical reception

Clockwork Gray is the third studio album by American rapper Blaze Ya Dead Homie. Released on August 21, 2007, it peaked at #14 on the Billboard Top Independent Albums chart and #34 on the Top R&B/Hip-Hop Albums chart.

Track listing

Personnel 
Information taken from Allmusic.

Musicians 
 Jamie Madrox — vocals
 Violent J - vocals
 Monoxide — vocals
 Boondox - vocals
 R.O.C. — vocals
 Big B — vocals
 Kutt Calhoun — vocals

Production 
 Butch — audio production
 DJ Clay — audio production
 UnderRated — audio production
 R.O.C. — audio production
 Randy Lynch — audio production
 Shaggy 2 Dope — audio production
 Scott Sumner — producer, mixing, audio production
 Fritz the Cat — producer, mixing, audio production

Chart positions

References 

2007 albums
Blaze Ya Dead Homie albums
Psychopathic Records albums
Horrorcore albums